Østfold Energi is a Norwegian energy producer within the business areas of hydropower, wind and heat. The company operates hydroelectric power plants in Østfold and Sogn og Fjordane with an annual power production of 1,680 TW·h/year. The power plants operated by Østfold Energi are Borgund power plant (1013 GWh/year), Stuvane power plant (165 GW·h/yr), Nyset-Steggje power plant (449 GW·h/yr), Brekke power plant (30 GW·h/yr), Tistedalsfoss power plant (13 GW·h/yr) and Ørje power plant (9 GW·h/yr).

In 2009 Østfold Energi, together with Nord-Trøndelag Elektrisitetsverk, purchased Siso and Lakshola power plants in Nordland county. Combined production at the power plants totals around 1 TWh. This acquisition brings Østfold Energi’s share of Norway’s total hydropower production to around 1.7 per cent.

Østfold Energi is co-owner of Kvalheim Kraft DA who owns and operates the windmill park Mehuken in Sogn og Fjordane on the west coast of Norway. The wind farm was opened in 2001 with five wind turbines. In 2010 the wind farm was extended with additional eight wind turbines. The annual production of electricity is now 65 GWh. The approximately 3,000 households in the Vågsøy municipality are now self-supported with electricity from the wind turbines at Mehuken.

Østfold Energi owns and operates two modern waste-to-energy plants. The plant in Sarpsborg converts waste residue (house refuse and industrial waste) into thermal energy (process steam) to Borregaard. The plant in Rakkestad provides process steam and district heating to nearby industrial companies. Totally 181 GWh thermal energy was produced at the waste-to-energy plants during 2010.

The company also holds ownership of Zephyr (33%), Norsk Grønnkraft (25%), Kvalheim Kraft (33%), Rygge sivile lufthavn (15%) and Hafslund (4.5%).

The company is owned by Østfold county municipality and thirteen municipalities in Østfold: Østfold county municipality (50%), the municipality of Sarpsborg (14.29%), Halden (7.14%), Moss (7.14%), Askim (4.29%), Fredrikstad (4.29%), Eidsberg (2.86%), Aremark (1.43%), Hobøl (1.43%), Marker (1.43%), Rømskog (1.43%), Skiptvet (1.43%), Spydeberg (1.43%), Våler (1.43%).

In 2011, NIB and the Norwegian energy company Østfold Energi signed a loan totalling NOK 179 million (EUR 23 million) for financing investments in wind and hydropower production, and district heating plants.

In 2014, Østfold Energi sold its shares in EfW heat provider, Hafslund ASA. The managing director Oddmund Kroken said, the energy firm will use the cash to invest €30.7m in other renewable energy projects.

In April 2017, Orkla, Thon Holding AS and Østfold Energi have entered into an agreement with the investment company Jotunfjell Partners for the sale of Rygge Sivile Lufthavn AS.

History
The company was created through the 1960s to the 1980s as a merger between the municipal owned power companies throughout Østfold, with only five municipalities not joining. Until 1997 the company was named Østfold Energiverk.

In 2000 49% of the grid and retail subsidiaries were sold to Swedish Sydkraft, and in 2003 Sydkraft took over the distribution, installation and retailing subsidiaries while the power production was left in Østfold Energi. The same year Sydkraft swapped its ownership to Fortum in a business deal.

References

Electric power companies of Norway
Companies based in Østfold
Energy companies established in 1900
1900 establishments in Norway
Companies owned by municipalities of Norway
County-owned companies of Norway
Østfold County Municipality